Mrkovići is a village in Centar municipality, in Sarajevo, Federation of Bosnia and Herzegovina, Bosnia and Herzegovina.

Demographics

Ethnic composition, 1991 census

total: 232

 Serbs - 229 (98.70%)
 "Yugoslavs" - 1 (0.43%)
 others and unknown - 2 (0.86%)

According to the 2013 census, its population was 55.

References

Populated places in Centar, Sarajevo
Neighbourhoods in Grad Sarajevo